Qasem Kandi may refer to:
 Qasem Kandi, Germi, Ardabil Province
 Qasem Kandi, Meshgin Shahr, Ardabil Province
 Qasem Kandi, East Azerbaijan